"Let You Love Me" is a song by British singer Rita Ora, released on 21 September 2018 as the fourth single from her second studio album, Phoenix (2018). The music video was released on the same day.

The song reached the top ten in twenty countries, including the United Kingdom where it peaked at number four. It became Ora's thirteenth song to reach the UK top ten, thus breaking the record for the most top ten songs by a British female solo artist.

Music video
The accompanying music video for "Let You Love Me" was released on YouTube on 21 September 2018. The video was filmed in London and directed by Malia James. An acoustic performance of the song was uploaded on 9 November 2018.

Live performances
Ora performed "Let You Love Me" for the first time at the Gibraltar Music Festival on 22 September 2018. Her first televised performance of the song was on the 6 October episode of The Jonathan Ross Show. On 26 October, Ora performed the song in costume as Post Malone at KISS FM's Haunted House Party. She later performed it on the Strictly Come Dancing results show on 28 October.

Ora's first performance of the song in the US was at the People's Choice Awards, on 11 November. She performed an acoustic version of the song as part of BBC Radio 1's Live Lounge on 19 November. Ora performed the song on a float during the 2018 Macy's Thanksgiving Day Parade in New York City, on 22 November. She attracted criticism for lip syncing, a practice which is common during the parade, after there was an issue with the sound on her float, so it appeared that she was singing out of time with the song. She was praised for her recovery by fellow performers after the parade.

Ora performed the song at the 2018 ARIA Awards on 28 November. She later performed the song on Michael McIntyre's Big Show on 1 December, and on Victoria's Secret Fashion Show on 2 December. She also performed the song with a live band on Jimmy Kimmel Live!, on 5 December.

Track listing
Digital download
"Let You Love Me" – 3:10

Digital download – Acoustic
"Let You Love Me" (Acoustic) – 3:09

Digital download – Remixes
"Let You Love Me" (Möwe Remix) – 3:06
"Let You Love Me" (James Hype Remix) – 3:42

Personnel
Credits adapted from Tidal.

Fred Gibson – producer, backing vocals, drums, guitar, keyboards, programmer
Finn Keane – producer, backing vocals, drums, keyboards, programmer
Michael Freeman – assistant mix engineer
Daniel Zaidenstadt – engineer
Alex Gordon – mastering
Mark "Spike" Stent – mixing

Charts

Weekly charts

Year-end charts

Certifications

Release history

References

2018 singles
2018 songs
Rita Ora songs
Number-one singles in Poland
Songs written by Rita Ora
Songs written by Ilsey Juber
Songs written by Noonie Bao
Songs written by Linus Wiklund
Songs written by Fred Again
Electropop songs